Food physical chemistry is considered to be a branch of Food chemistry concerned with the study of both physical and chemical interactions in foods in terms of physical and chemical principles applied to food systems, as well as the applications of physical/chemical techniques and instrumentation for the study of foods.  This field encompasses the "physiochemical principles of the reactions and conversions that occur during the manufacture, handling, and storage of foods."

Food physical chemistry concepts are often drawn from rheology, theories of transport phenomena, physical and chemical thermodynamics, chemical bonds and interaction forces, quantum mechanics and reaction kinetics,  biopolymer science, colloidal interactions, nucleation, glass transitions, and freezing, disordered/noncrystalline solids.

Techniques utilized range widely from dynamic rheometry, optical microscopy, electron microscopy, AFM, light scattering, X-ray diffraction/neutron diffraction, to MRI, spectroscopy (NMR, FT-NIR/IR, NIRS, ESR and EPR, CD/VCD, Fluorescence, FCS, HPLC, GC-MS, and other related analytical techniques.

Understanding food processes and the properties of foods requires a knowledge of physical chemistry and how it applies to specific foods and food processes. Food physical chemistry is essential for improving the quality of foods, their stability, and food product development. Because food science is a multi-disciplinary field, food physical chemistry is being developed through interactions with other areas of food chemistry and food science, such as food analytical chemistry, food process engineering/food processing, food and bioprocess technology, food extrusion, food quality control, food packaging, food biotechnology, and food microbiology.

Topics in Food physical chemistry
The following are examples of topics in food physical chemistry that are of interest to both the food industry and food science:

 Water in foods
 Local structure in liquid water
 Micro-crystallization in ice cream emulsions
 Dispersion and surface-adsorption processes in foods
 Water and protein activities
 Food hydration and shelf-life
 Hydrophobic interactions in foods
 Hydrogen bonding and ionic interactions in foods
 Disulfide bond breaking and formation in foods
 Food dispersions
 Structure-functionality in foods
 Food micro- and nano- structure
 Food gels and gelling mechanisms
 Cross-linking in foods
 Starch gelatinization and retrogradation
 Physico-chemical modification of carbohydrates
 Physico-chemical interactions in food formulations
 Freezing effects on foods and freeze concentration of liquids
 Glass transition in wheat gluten and wheat doughs
 Drying of foods and crops
 Rheology of wheat doughs, cheese and meat
 Rheology of extrusion processes
 Food enzyme kinetics
 Immobilized enzymes and cells
 Microencapsulation
 Carbohydrates structure and interactions with water and proteins
 Maillard browning reactions
 Lipids structures and interactions with water and food proteins
 Food proteins structure, hydration and functionality in foods
 Food protein denaturation
 Food enzymes and reaction mechanisms
 Vitamin interactions and preservation during food processing
 Interaction of salts and minerals with food proteins and water
 Color determinations and food grade coloring
 Flavors and sensorial perception of foods
 Properties of food additives

Related fields

 Food chemistry
 Food physics and Rheology
 Biophysical chemistry
 Physical chemistry
 Spectroscopy-applied
 Intermolecular forces
 Nanotechnology and nanostructures
 Chemical physics
 Molecular dynamics
 Surface chemistry and Van der Waals forces
 Chemical reactions and Reaction chemistry
 Quantum chemistry
 Quantum genetics
 Molecular models of DNA and Molecular modelling of proteins and viruses
 Bioorganic chemistry
 Polymer chemistry
 Biochemistry and Biological chemistry
 Enzymology
 Protein–protein interactions
 Biomembranes
 Complex system biology
 Integrative biology
 Mathematical biophysics
 Systems biology
 Genomics, Proteomics, Interactomics, Structural bioinformatics and Cheminformatics
 Food technology, Food engineering, Food safety and Food biotechnology
 Agricultural biotechnology
Immobilized cells and enzymes
Microencapsulation of food additives and vitamins, etc.
 Chemical engineering
 Plant biology and Crop sciences
 Animal sciences

Techniques gallery: High-Field NMR, CARS (Raman spectroscopy), Fluorescence confocal microscopy and Hyperspectral imaging

See also

 Food chemistry
 Food Chemistry (journal)
 NMR
 ESR
 FTIR
 NIR
 FCS
 HPLC
 GC-MS
 Biophysical chemistry
 Protein–protein interactions
 Food processing
 Food engineering
 Food rheology
 Food extrusion
 Food packaging,
 food biotechnology
 Food safety
 Food science
 Food technology
 International Academy of Quantum Molecular Science
 List of important publications in chemistry#Physical chemistry
 List of unsolved problems in chemistry#Physical chemistry problems

References

Journals
 Journal of Agricultural and Food Chemistry
 Journal of the American Oil Chemists' Society
 Biophysical Chemistry journal
 Magnetic Resonance in Chemistry
 Starke/ Starch Journal
 Journal of Dairy Science (JDS)
 Chemical Physics Letters
 Zeitschrift für Physikalische Chemie (1887)
 Biopolymers
 Journal of Food Science (IFT, USA)
 International Journal of Food Science & Technology
 Macromolecular Chemistry and Physics (1947)
 Journal of the Science of Food and Agriculture
 Polymer Preprints (ACS)
 Integrative Biology Journal of the Royal Society of Chemistry
 Organic & Biomolecular Chemistry (An RSC Journal)
 Nature
 Nature Precedings
 Journal of Biological Chemistry
 Proceedings of the National Academy of Sciences of the United States of America

External links

ACS Division of Agricultural and Food Chemistry (AGFD)
American Chemical Society (ACS)
Institute of Food Science and Technology (IFST), (formerly IFT)
Dairy Science and Food Technology
Physical Chemistry. (Keith J. Laidler, John H. Meiser and Bryan C. Sanctuary)
The World of Physical Chemistry (Keith J. Laidler, 1993)
Physical Chemistry from Ostwald to Pauling (John W. Servos, 1996)
100 Years of Physical Chemistry (Royal Society of Chemistry, 2004)
The Cambridge History of Science: The modern physical and mathematical sciences (Mary Jo Nye, 2003)

Food chemistry
Physical chemistry